Five Days in July is the fifth studio album by Canadian country-rock band Blue Rodeo. It was released by WEA on October 26, 1993 in Canada and Discovery Records on September 27, 1994 in the United States. The band's most commercially successful album, it has been certified six times platinum as of 2008.

The album was recorded on singer/guitarist Greg Keelor's farm in Southern Ontario in July 1993. While the band originally intended for the recordings to serve only as demos, they found that the songs had a warmth and spontaneity that warranted releasing the collection as an album. Guest musicians on the album include Sarah McLachlan, Colin Linden and Anne Bourne. This album was keyboardist James Gray's first album with the band.

This album is supposed to be a tribute to the Harvest-era Neil Young sound. "5 Days in May", "Hasn't Hit Me Yet" and "Bad Timing" were notable hit singles for the band.

Track listing

Track trivia
"What Is This Love," "Dark Angel" and "Tell Me Your Dream" feature Sarah McLachlan.
Colin Linden appears on "Know Where You Go"
Singer/guitarist Jim Cuddy has said that "5 Days in May" was inspired by his sound engineer's practice of writing his wife's name in the sand whenever he finds himself on a beach. Cuddy noticed the engineer doing so while the band was on tour in New Zealand, and was inspired to write lyrics combining this story with the story of how Cuddy met his own wife.

Chart performance

Certifications

References

1993 albums
Blue Rodeo albums